Scapania is a genus of liverworts in the family Scapaniaceae. It contains the following species (but this list may be incomplete):

 Scapania aequiloba (Schwägr.) Dumort.
 Scapania apiculata Spruce 
 Scapania aspera M. Bernet & Bernet
 Scapania brevicaulis 
 Scapania calcicola (Arnell & J. Pers.) Ingham
 Scapania compacta (Roth) Dumort.
 Scapania curta (Mart.) Dumort.
 Scapania cuspiduligera (Nees) Müll.Frib.
 Scapania gracilis 
 Scapania helvetica Gottsche
 Scapania irrigua (Nees) Nees
 Scapania lingulata H. Buch
 Scapania mucronata 
 Scapania nemorea (L.) Grolle
 Scapania paludicola Loeske & Müll.Frib.
 Scapania paludosa (Müll.Frib.) Müll.Frib.
 Scapania praetervisa Meyl.
 Scapania sphaerifera, Buch & Tuom.
 Scapania subalpina (Lindenb.) Dumort.
 Scapania uliginosa (Sw. ex Lindenb.) Dumort.
 Scapania umbrosa (Schrad.) Dumort.
 Scapania undulata (L.) Dumort.

References

Scapaniaceae
Jungermanniales genera
Taxonomy articles created by Polbot